There are currently 1,258 genera, 156 families, 27 orders, and around 5,937 recognized living species of mammal. Mammalian taxonomy is in constant flux as many new species are described and recategorized within their respective genera and families. The taxonomy represented here is a compilation of the most logical and up-to-date information on mammalian taxonomy from many sources, the main ones being Handbook of the Mammals of the World series and Mammal Species of the World.

Afrosoricida

Suborder Tenrecomorpha

Family Tenrecidae – tenrecs and otter shrews
Subfamily Geogalinae
Genus Geogale – long-eared tenrec
Subfamily Oryzorictinae
Genus Microgale – shrew tenrecs
Genus Nesogale – shrew tenrecs
Genus Oryzorictes – rice tenrecs
Subfamily Tenrecinae
Genus Echinops – lesser hedgehog tenrec
Genus Hemicentetes – streaked tenrec
Genus Setifer – greater hedgehog tenrec
Genus Tenrec – common tenrec
Family Potamogalidae
Genus Micropotamogale – otter shrews
Genus Potamogale – giant otter shrew

Suborder Chrysochloridea
Family Chrysochloridae – golden moles
Subfamily Chrysochlorinae
Genus Carpitalpa – Arend's golden mole
Genus Chlorotalpa – forty-toothed golden moles
Genus Chrysochloris – Cape golden moles
Genus Chrysospalax – giant golden moles
Genus Cryptochloris – cryptic golden moles
Genus Eremitalpa – Grant's golden mole
Subfamily Amblysominae
Genus Amblysomus – narrow-headed golden moles
Genus Calcochloris – yellow golden moles
Genus Huetia - Congo golden mole
Genus Neamblysomus – lesser narrow-headed golden moles

Carnivora

The order Carnivora is represented by 16 families of mostly carnivorous and omnivorous mammals found worldwide terrestrially and in marine waters of the poles and some areas of the tropics. Divided into two large suborders, Caniformia (Canidae, Ursidae, Ailuridae, Procyonidae, Mephitidae, Mustelidae, and the Pinnipeds, Otariidae, Phocidae, and Odobenidae) and Feliformia (Nandiniidae, Felidae, Prionodontidae, Viverridae, Hyaenidae, Herpestidae, and Eupleridae), the order contains about 289 recognized species, along with 4 recently extinct species, one of which is included in its own monotypic genus, Dusicyon. Tribe and subfamily taxonomy comes mostly from the first volume of the Handbook of the Mammals of the World on carnivores for the terrestrial species, and the 4th volume on marine mammals for the 3 marine families.

Suborder Caniformia 
 Infraorder Cynoidea
 Superfamily Canoidea
Family Canidae – dogs
Genus Atelocynus – short-eared dog
Genus Canis – wolves and jackals
Genus Cerdocyon – crab-eating fox
Genus Chrysocyon – maned wolf
Genus Cuon – dhole
Genus †Dusicyon – warrahs
Genus Lupulella – jackals
Genus Lycalopex – Neotropical foxes
Genus Lycaon – African wild dog
Genus Nyctereutes – raccoon dogs
Genus Otocyon – bat-eared fox
Genus Speothos – bush dog
Genus Urocyon – gray foxes
Genus Vulpes – typical foxes
 Infraorder Arctoidea
 Parvorder Ursida
 Superfamily Ursoidea
Family Ursidae – bears
Subfamily Ailuropodinae
Genus Ailuropoda – giant panda
Subfamily Tremarctinae
Genus Tremarctos – Andean bear
Subfamily Ursinae
Genus Helarctos – sun bear
Genus Melursus – sloth bear
Genus Ursus – Holarctic bears
 Superfamily Musteloidea
Family Ailuridae – red pandas
Genus Ailurus – red pandas
Family Mephitidae – skunks and stink badgers
Genus Conepatus – hog-nosed skunks
Genus Mephitis – striped and hooded skunks
Genus Mydaus – stink badgers
Genus Spilogale – spotted skunks
Family Mustelidae – weasels, badgers, and otters
Subfamily Guloninae
Genus Eira – tayra
Genus Gulo – wolverine
Genus Martes – martens
Genus Pekania - fisher
Subfamily Helictidinae
Genus Melogale – ferret-badgers
Subfamily Ictonychinae
Genus Galictis – grison
Genus Ictonyx – striped polecats
Genus Lyncodon – Patagonian weasel
Genus Poecilogale – African striped weasel
Genus Vormela – marbled polecat
Subfamily Lutrinae
Genus Aonyx – clawless otters
Genus Enhydra – sea otter
Genus Hydrictis – spotted-necked otter
Genus Lontra – New World otters
Genus Lutra – Eurasian otters
Genus Lutrogale – smooth-coated otter
Genus Pteronura – giant otter
Subfamily Melinae
Genus Arctonyx – hog badgers
Genus Meles – Eurasian badgers
Subfamily Mellivorinae
Genus Mellivora – honey badger
Subfamily Mustelinae
Genus Mustela – weasels
Genus Neogale – New World weasels
Subfamily Taxidiinae
Genus Taxidea – American badger
Family Procyonidae – raccoons and relatives
Subfamily Procyoninae
Tribe Procyonini
Subtribe Procyonina
Genus Procyon – raccoons
Subtribe Nasuina
Genus Nasua – coatis
Genus Nasuella – mountain coati
Tribe Bassariscini
Genus Bassaricyon – olingos
Subfamily Potosinae
Genus Potos – kinkajou
Genus Bassariscus – ringtails
 (unranked) Pinnipedimorpha
 (unranked) Pinnipediformes
 (unranked) Pinnipedia
 Superfamily Otarioidea
Family Odobenidae – walrus
Genus Odobenus – walrus
Family Otariidae – eared seals
Subfamily Arctocephalinae – fur seals
Genus Arctocephalus – brown fur seal
Genus Callorhinus – northern fur seal
Subfamily Otariinae – sea lions
Genus Eumetopias – Steller sea lion
Genus Neophoca – Australian sea lion
Genus Phocarctos – New Zealand sea lion
Genus Zalophus – northern sea lions
Genus Otaria – South American sea lion
 Superfamily Phocoidea
Family Phocidae – earless seals
Subfamily Monachinae
Tribe Lobodontini
Genus Hydrurga – leopard seal
Genus Leptonychotes – Weddell seal
Genus Lobodon – crabeater seal
Genus Ommatophoca – Ross seal
Tribe Miroungini
Genus Mirounga – elephant seals
Tribe Monachini
Genus Monachus – Mediterranean monk seal
Genus Neomonachus – Hawaiian and Caribbean monk seals
Subfamily Phocinae
Tribe Cystophorini
Genus Cystophora – hooded seal
Tribe Erignathini
Genus Erignathus – bearded seal
Tribe Phocini
Genus Halichoerus – gray seal
Genus Histriophoca – ribbon seal
Genus Pagophilus – harp seal
Genus Phoca – harbor and spotted seal
Genus Pusa – ringed and inland seals

Suborder Feliformia 
Family Nandiniidae – African palm civet
Genus Nandinia – African palm civet
Superfamily Feloidea
Family Felidae – cats
Subfamily Pantherinae
Genus Neofelis – clouded leopards
Genus Panthera – lion, tiger, leopard, jaguar, snow leopard
Subfamily Felinae
Genus Catopuma – Bay cat and Asian golden cat
Genus Pardofelis – marbled cat
Genus Caracal – caracal and African golden cat
Genus Leptailurus – serval
Genus Leopardus – New World small cats
Genus Lynx – lynxes
Genus Puma – cougar
Genus Herpailurus - jaguarundi
Genus Acinonyx – cheetah
Genus Prionailurus – South Asian small cats
Genus Otocolobus – Pallas's cat
Genus Felis – Old World small cats
Family Prionodontidae – Asian linsangs
Genus Prionodon – linsangs
Infraorder Viverroidea
Family Viverridae – civets, genets, and oyans
Subfamily Viverrinae
Genus Viverricula – small Indian civet
Genus Viverra – civets
Genus Civettictis – African civet
Subfamily Genettinae
Genus Poiana – oyans
Genus Genetta – genets
Subfamily Hemigalinae
Genus Cynogale – otter civet
Genus Chrotogale – Owston's palm civet
Genus Hemigalus – banded palm civet
Genus Diplogale – Hose's palm civet
Genus Macrogalidia – Sulawesi palm civet
Subfamily Paradoxurinae
Genus Paradoxurus – Asian and golden palm civets
Genus Paguma – masked palm civet
Genus Arctogalidia – small-toothed palm civet
Genus Arctictis – binturong
Superfamily Herpestoidea
Family Hyaenidae – hyenas
Subfamily Protelinae
Genus Proteles – aardwolf
Subfamily Hyaeninae
Genus Crocuta – spotted hyena
Genus Hyaena – striped hyena
Genus Parahyaena – brown hyena
Family Herpestidae – mongooses
Subfamily Mungotinae
Genus Crossarchus – cusimanse
Genus Liberiictis – Liberian mongoose
Genus Suricata – meerkat
Genus Dologale – Pousargues's mongoose
Genus Helogale – dwarf mongooses
Genus Mungos – Gambian and banded mongooses
Subfamily Herpestinae
Genus Atilax – marsh mongoose
Genus Xenogale – long-nosed mongoose
Genus Herpestes – African mongooses
Genus Cynictis – yellow mongoose
Genus Paracynictis – Selous's mongoose
Genus Bdeogale – bushy-tailed mongooses
Genus Ichneumia – white-tailed mongoose
Genus Rhynchogale – Meller's mongoose
Genus Urva – Asian mongooses
Family Eupleridae – Malagasy carnivores
Subfamily Euplerinae
Genus Cryptoprocta – fossas
Genus Eupleres – falanouc
Genus Fossa – spotted fanaloka
Subfamily Galidiinae
Genus Galidia – ring-tailed vontsira
Genus Galidictis – striped vontsira
Genus Mungotictis – narrow-striped boky
Genus Salanoia – brown vontsira

Cetartiodactyla

Cetartiodactyla is a large order of hoofed mammals, the even-toed ungulates, and aquatic mammals, cetaceans. Cetacea was found to be nested within "Artiodactlya" and has now been moved into that order, whose name is now Cetartiodactyla  Even-toed ungulates are found nearly world-wide, although no species are native to Australia or Antarctica. Broken into four suborders, Tylopoda (including Camelidae), Suina (including Suidae and Tayassuidae), Whippomorpha (including Hippopotamidae and the infraorder Cetacea), and Ruminantia, which contains two infraorders, Tragulina (including Tragulidae) and Pecora (including Moschidae, Cervidae, Bovidae, Antilocapridae, and Giraffidae). The higher taxonomy used for the ungulates of this order is based primarily on the Handbook of the Mammals of the World, Volume 2 on hoofed mammals, including the subfamily and tribal affiliations in each family. The order includes about 242 recognized ungulate species, along with 6 recently extinct species. Groves and Grubbs Taxonomy of Ungulates is used as a minor reference for the Bovids. Cetacea contains Balaenopteridae) and Odontoceti (including Physeteridae, Kogiidae, Ziphiidae, Platanistidae, Iniidae, Lipotidae, Pontoporiidae, Monodontidae, Delphinidae, and Phocoenidae), which include a total of 14 families, most of which have few representative species. The taxonomy here is exemplified by the 4th volume of the Handbook of the Mammals of the World on marine mammals.

Suborder Tylopoda 
Family Camelidae – camels and relatives
Tribe Lamini
Genus Lama – New World camelids
Tribe Camelini
Genus Camelus – camels

Suborder Suina 
Family Suidae – pigs
Genus Babyrousa – babirusa
Genus Phacochoerus – warthogs
Genus Hylochoerus – giant forest hog
Genus Potamochoerus – bushpigs
Genus Sus – typical pigs
Genus Porcula – pygmy hog
Family Tayassuidae – peccaries
Genus Catagonus – Chacoan peccary
Genus Tayassu – white-lipped peccary
Genus Dicotyles – collared peccary

Suborder Whippomorpha 
Infraorder Ancodonta
Family Hippopotamidae – hippopotamuses
Genus Hippopotamus – common hippopotamus
Genus Choeropsis – pygmy hippopotamus
 Infraorder Cetacea
 Parvorder Mysticeti - baleen whales
 Superfamily Balaenoidea
 Family Balaenidae – right and bowhead whales
Genus Eubalaena – right whales
Genus Balaena – bowhead whale
 Family Cetotheriidae – pygmy right whale
Genus Caperea – pygmy right whale
 Superfamily Balaenopteroidea
 Family Eschrichtiidae – gray whale
Genus Eschrichtius – gray whale
 Family Balaenopteridae – rorquals
Genus Megaptera – humpback whale
Genus Balaenoptera – rorquals
 Parvorder Odontoceti - toothed whales
 Superfamily Delphinoidea
Family Monodontidae – narwhal and beluga
Subfamily Delphinapterinae
Genus Delphinapterus – beluga
Subfamily Monodontinae
Genus Monodon – narwhal
Family Delphinidae – oceanic dolphins
Subfamily Delphininae
Genus Delphinus – common dolphins
Genus Lagenodelphis – Fraser's dolphin
Genus Sotalia – tucuxi and Guiana dolphin
Genus Sousa – humpback dolphins
Genus Stenella – striped, spotted, and spinner dolphins
Genus Tursiops – bottlenose dolphins
Subfamily Lissodelphininae
Genus Lissodelphis – right whale dolphins
Genus Cephalorhynchus – Antarctic dolphins
Subfamily Globicephalinae
Genus Globicephala – pilot whales
Genus Feresa – pygmy killer whale
Genus Grampus – Risso's dolphin
Genus Orcaella – snubfin dolphins
Genus Peponocephala – melon-headed whale
Genus Steno – rough-toothed dolphin
Genus Pseudorca – false killer whale
Subfamily Orcininae
Genus Orcinus – killer whale
Subfamily Incertae sedis
Genus Lagenorhynchus – whitebeaked, white-sided, hourglass, Peale's and dusky dolphin
Family Phocoenidae – porpoises
Genus Neophocaena – finless porpoises
Genus Phocoenoides – Dall's porpoise
Genus Phocoena – typical porpoises
Superfamily Physeteroidea
 Family Physeteridae – sperm whale
Genus Physeter – sperm whale
 Family Kogiidae – pygmy and dwarf sperm whales
Genus Kogia – pygmy and dwarf sperm whales
Superfamily Ziphioidea
Family Ziphiidae – beaked whales
Subfamily Berardiinae
Genus Berardius – giant beaked whales
Subfamily Ziphiinae
Genus Ziphius – Cuvier's beaked whale
Genus Tasmacetus – Shepherd's beaked whale
Subfamily Hyperoodontinae
Genus Hyperoodon – bottlenose whales
Genus Indopacetus – Longman's beaked whale
Genus Mesoplodon – mesoplodont beaked whales
Superfamily Platanistoidea
Family Platanistidae – South Asian river dolphins
Genus Platanista – South Asian river dolphins
Family Iniidae – Amazon river dolphins
Genus Inia – Amazon river dolphins
Family Lipotidae – baiji
Genus Lipotes – baiji
Family Pontoporiidae – franciscana
Genus Pontoporia – franciscana

Suborder Ruminantia 
Infraorder Tragulina
Family Tragulidae – chevrotain
Genus Hyemoschus – water chevrotain
Genus Moschiola – spotted chevrotain
Genus Tragulus – common chevrotain
Infraorder Pecora
Family Antilocapridae – pronghorn
Genus Antilocapra – pronghorn
Family Giraffidae – giraffe and okapi
Genus Giraffa – giraffes
Genus Okapia – okapi
Family Cervidae – deer
Subfamily Capreolinae
Tribe Capreolini
Genus Hydropotes – Chinese water deer
Genus Capreolus – roe deer
Tribe Alceini
Genus Alces – moose
Tribe Odocoileini
Genus Rangifer – caribou
Genus Odocoileus – Nearctic deer
Genus Ozotoceros – Pampas deer
Genus Blastocerus – marsh deer
Genus Mazama – brockets
Genus Hippocamelus – huemel
Genus Pudu – pudu
Subfamily Cervinae
Tribe Cervini
Genus Rusa – rusa deer
Genus Rucervus – Asian swamp deer
Genus Dama – fallow deer
Genus Axis – hog deer
Genus Elaphodus – tufted deer
Genus Elaphurus – Père David's deer
Genus Cervus – typical deer
Tribe Muntiacini
Genus Muntiacus – muntjacs
Family Moschidae – musk deer
Genus Moschus – musk deer
Family Bovidae – hollow-horned ungulates
Subfamily Bovinae
Tribe Bovini
Subtribe Pseudorygina
Genus Pseudoryx – saola
Subtribe Bubalina
Genus Bubalus – Asian buffaloes
Genus Syncerus – African buffalo
Subtribe Bovina
Genus Bison – bison 
Genus Bos – cattle
Tribe Boselaphini
Genus Boselaphus – nilgai
Genus Tetracerus – four-horned antelope
Tribe Tragelaphini
Genus Tragelaphus – bushbuck, bongo, nyala, kudu, and sitatunga
Genus Taurotragus – elands
Clade Aegodontia
Subfamily Aepycerotinae
Genus Aepyceros – impala
Subfamily Neotraginae
Genus Neotragus – pygmy antelopes
Subfamily Cephalophinae
Genus Sylvicapra – bush duiker
Genus Philantomba – blue duikers
Genus Cephalophus – typical duikers
Subfamily Oreotraginae
Genus Oreotragus – klipspringer
Subfamily Antilopinae
Tribe Antilopini
Genus Ammodorcas – dibatag
Genus Antidorcas – springbok
Genus Antilope – blackbuck
Genus Eudorcas – side-striped gazelle
Genus Gazella – typical gazelle
Genus Litocranius – gerenuk
Genus Nanger – Saharan gazelle
Genus Procapra – Chinese gazelle
Tribe Saigini
Genus Saiga – saiga
Tribe Neotragini
Genus Dorcatragus – beira
Genus Madoqua – dik-dik
Genus Neotragus
Genus Ourebia – oribi
Genus Raphicerus – steenbok and grysbok
Subfamily Reduncinae
Genus Redunca – reedbucks
Genus Kobus – kobs, lechwe, and waterbucks
Genus Pelea – rhebok
Subfamily Caprinae
Tribe Caprini
Genus Ammotragus – Barbary sheep
Genus Arabitragus – Arabian tahr
Genus Budorcas – takin
Genus Capra – goats and ibexes
Genus Hemitragus – Himalayan tahr
Genus Nilgiritragus – Nilgiri tahr
Genus Oreamnos – Rocky Mountain goat
Genus Ovis – sheep
Genus Pseudois – blue sheep
Genus Rupicapra – chamois
Tribe Ovibovini
Genus Capricornis – serows
Genus Nemorhaedus – goral
Genus Ovibos – muskox
Tribe Pantholopini
Genus Pantholops – chiru
Subfamily Alcelaphinae
Genus Alcelaphus – hartebeest
Genus Connochaetes – wildebeest
Genus Damaliscus – topi and bontebok
Genus Beatragus – hirola
Subfamily Hippotraginae
Genus Hippotragus – sable and roan antelopes
Genus Addax – addax
Genus Oryx – oryx

Chiroptera

The order Chiroptera comprises bats and is the second largest order of mammals, containing about 1,240 species of bats, which is around 20% of all mammal species.

Suborder Yangochiroptera 
 Family Emballonuridae – sac-winged bats
 Genus Balantiopteryx
 Genus Centronycteris – shaggy bats
 Genus Coleura
 Genus Cormura – chestnut sac-winged bat
 Genus Cyttarops – short-eared bat
 Genus Diclidurus – ghost bats
 Genus Emballonura – sheath-tailed bats
 Genus Mosia – dark sheath-tailed bat
 Genus Paremballonura – Peter's sheath-tailed bat
 Genus Peropteryx – dog-like bats
 Genus Rhynchonycteris – proboscis bat
 Genus Saccolaimus – pouched bats
 Genus Saccopteryx
 Genus Taphozous – tomb bats
 Family Furipteridae
 Genus Amorphochilus – smoky bat
 Genus Furipterus – thumbless bat
 Family Miniopteridae
 Genus Miniopterus – bent-winged or long winged bats
 Family Molossidae – free-tailed bats
 Subfamily Molossinae
 Genus Austronomus – Australasian free-tailed bats
 Genus Chaerephon – lesser mastiff bats
 Genus Cheiromeles – naked bats
 Genus Cynomops – dog-faced bats
 Genus Eumops – bonneted bats
 Genus Mormopterus
 Genus Molossops – broad-faced bats
 Genus Molossus – velvety free-tailed bats
 Genus Mops – greater mastiff bats
 Genus Myopterus – African free-tailed bats
 Genus Neoplatymops
 Genus Nyctinomops – New World free-tailed bats
 Genus Otomops – big-eared free-tailed bats
 Genus Platymops – Peters's flat-headed bat
 Genus Promops – domed-palate mastiff bats
 Genus Sauromys – Roberts's flat-headed bat
 Genus Tadarida – common free-tailed bats
 Subfamily Tomopeatinae
 Genus Tomopeas – blunt-eared bat
 Family Mormoopidae
 Genus Mormoops – ghost-faced bats
 Genus Pteronotus – mustached bats and naked-backed bats
 Family Mystacinidae – New Zealand short-tailed bats
 Genus Mystacina
 Family Myzopodidae – sucker-footed bats
 Genus Myzopoda
 Family Natalidae – funnel-eared bats
 Genus Chilonatalus
 Genus Natalus
 Genus Nyctiellus – Gervais's funnel-eared bat
 Genus †Primonatalus – Primonatalus prattae
 Family Noctilionidae – bulldog bats
 Genus Noctilio
 Family Nycteridae – hollow-faced bats
 Genus Nycteris
 Family Phyllostomidae – leaf-nosed bats
 Subfamily Brachyphyllinae
 Genus Brachyphylla
 Subfamily Carolliinae
 Genus Carollia – short-tailed leaf-nosed bats
 Genus Rhinophylla – little fruit bats
 Subfamily Desmodontinae – vampire bats
 Genus Desmodus
 Genus Diaemus – white-winged vampire bat
 Genus Diphylla – hairy-legged vampire bat
 Subfamily Glossophaginae
 Tribe Glossophagini
 Genus Anoura – Geoffroy's long-nosed bats
 Genus Choeroniscus
 Genus Choeronycteris – Mexican long-tongued bat
 Genus Dryadonycteris
 Genus Glossophaga – various long-tongued bats
 Genus Hylonycteris – Underwood's long-tongued bat
 Genus Leptonycteris – Saussure's long-nosed bats
 Genus Lichonycteris – dark long-tongued bat
 Genus Monophyllus – Antillean long-tongued bats
 Genus Musonycteris – banana bat
 Genus Scleronycteris – Ega long-tongued bat
 Tribe Lonchophyllini
 Genus Lionycteris – chestnut long-tongued bat
 Genus Lonchophylla – nectar bats
 Genus Platalina – long-snouted bat
 Genus Xeronycteris – Vieira's long-tongued bat
 Subfamily Phyllonycterinae
 Genus Erophylla – brown flower bats
 Genus Phyllonycteris – Jamaican flower bats
 Subfamily Phyllostominae
 Tribe Micronycterini
 Genus Glyphonycteris
 Genus Lampronycteris – yellow-throated big-eared bat
 Genus Macrotus – leaf-nosed bats
 Genus Micronycteris – little big-eared bats
 Genus Neonycteris – least big-eared bat
 Genus Trinycteris – Niceforo's big-eared bat
 Tribe Vampyrini
 Genus Chrotopterus – big-eared woolly bat
 Genus Lophostoma – some round-eared bats
 Genus Tonatia – more round-eared bats
 Genus Trachops – fringe-lipped bat
 Genus Vampyrum – spectral bat
 Tribe Lonchorhinini
 Genus Lonchorhina – sword-nosed bats
 Genus Macrophyllum – long-legged bat
 Genus Mimon – Gray's spear-nosed bats
 Tribe Phyllostomatini
 Genus Phylloderma – pale-faced bat
 Genus Phyllostomus – spear-nosed bats
 Subfamily Stenodermatinae
 Genus Ametrida – little white-shouldered bat
 Genus Ardops – tree bat
 Genus Ariteus – Jamaican fig-eating bat
 Genus Artibeus – Neotropical fruit bats
 Genus Centurio – wrinkle-faced bat
 Genus Chiroderma – big-eyed bats
 Genus Ectophylla – Honduran white bat
 Genus Enchisthenes – velvety fruit-eating bat
 Genus Mesophylla – MacConnell's bat
 Genus Phyllops – Cuban fig-eating bat
 Genus Platyrrhinus – broad-nosed bats
 Genus Pygoderma – Ipanema bat
 Genus Sphaeronycteris – visored bat
 Genus Stenoderma – red fruit bat
 Genus Sturnira – yellow-shouldered bats
 Genus Uroderma – tent-making bats
 Genus Vampyressa – yellow-eared bats
 Genus Vampyriscus – yellow-eared bats
 Genus Vampyrodes – great stripe-faced bat
 Family Thyropteridae – disk-winged bats
 Genus Thyroptera
 Family Cistugidae
 Genus Cistugo – wing-gland bats
 Family Vespertilionidae – vesper bats
 Subfamily Kerivoulinae
 Genus Kerivoula – painted bats
 Genus Phoniscus – trumpet-eared bats
 Subfamily Murininae
 Genus Harpiocephalus – hairy-winged bats
 Genus Harpiola
 Genus Murina – tube-nosed insectivorous bats
 Subfamily Myotinae
 Genus Myotis – mouse-eared bats
 Genus Eudiscopus – disk-footed bat
 Genus Submyotodon – broad-muzzled bats
 Subfamily Vespertilioninae
 Tribe Antrozoini
 Genus Antrozous – pallid bat
 Genus Bauerus – Van Gelder's bat
 Genus Rhogeessa – rhogeessa bats
 Tribe Eptesicini
 Genus Arielulus
 Genus Eptesicus – house bats
 Genus Glauconycteris – butterfly bats
 Genus Hesperoptenus – false serotine bats
 Genus Histiotus – big-eared brown bats
 Genus Ia – great evening bat
 Genus Lasionycteris – silver-haired bat
 Genus Scoteanax – Rüppell's broad-nosed bat
 Genus Scotomanes – harlequin bat
 Genus Scotorepens – lesser broad-nosed bats
 Genus Thainycteris
 Tribe Lasiurini
 Genus Aeorestes – hoary bats
 Genus Dasypterus – yellow bats
 Genus Lasiurus – hairy-tailed bats
 Tribe Nycticeiini
 Genus Nycticeius – evening bats
 Tribe Perimyotini
 Genus Parastrellus – western pipistrelle
 Genus Perimyotis – eastern pipistrelle
 Tribe Pipistrellini
 Genus Glischropus – thick-thumbed bats
 Genus Nyctalus – noctule bats
 Genus Pipistrellus – some of the pipistrelle bats
 Genus Scotoecus – house bats
 Genus Scotozous – Dormer's bat
 Genus Vansonia – Rüppell's pipistrelle
 Tribe Plecotini
 Genus Barbastella – barbastelles
 Genus Corynorhinus – American lump-nosed bats
 Genus Euderma – spotted bat
 Genus Idionycteris – Allen's big-eared bat
 Genus Otonycteris – desert long-eared bat
 Genus Plecotus – lump-nosed bats
 Tribe Scotophilini
 Genus Scotophilus – yellow bats
 Tribe Vespertilionini
 Genus Afronycteris 
 Genus Cassistrellus – helmeted bats
 Genus Chalinolobus – wattled bats
 Genus Falsistrellus
 Genus Hypsugo – Asian pipistrelles
 Genus Laephotis – long-eared bats
 Genus Mimetillus – Moloney's mimic bat
 Genus Mirostrellus – Joffre's bat
 Genus Neoromicia
 Genus Nycticeinops – Schlieffen's bat
 Genus Nyctophilus – New Guinean and Australian big-eared bats
 Genus Pharotis – New Guinea big-eared bat
 Genus Pseudoromicia – Sub-Saharan vesper bats (serotines)
 Genus Philetor – Rohu's bat
 Genus Tylonycteris – bamboo bats
 Genus Vespadelus – includes forest bats
 Genus Vespertilio – frosted bats
 Tribe incertae sedis
 Genus Rhyneptesicus – Sind bat

Suborder Yinpterochiroptera 
 Family Craseonycteridae – Kitti's hog-nosed bat (also known as the bumblebee bat)
 Genus Craseonycteris
 Family Hipposideridae – Old World leaf-nosed bats
 Genus Anthops – flower-faced bat
 Genus Asellia
 Genus Aselliscus – 3 trident bat species
 Genus Coelops – tailless leaf-nosed bats
 Genus Hipposideros – roundleaf bats
 Genus Macronycteris
 Family Megadermatidae – false vampire bats
 Genus Cardioderma – heart-nosed bat
 Genus Lavia – yellow-winged bat
 Genus Macroderma – ghost bat
 Genus Megaderma – lesser and greater false vampire bats
 Genus Eudiscoderma – Thongaree's disc-nosed bat
 Family Pteropodidae – megabats
 Subfamily Cynopterinae
 Genus Aethalops – pygmy fruit bats
 Genus Alionycteris – Mindanao pygmy fruit bat
 Genus Balionycteris – spot-winged fruit bat
 Genus Chironax – black-capped fruit bat
 Genus Cynopterus – short-nosed fruit bats
 Genus Dyacopterus – dayak fruit bats
 Genus Haplonycteris – Fischer's pygmy fruit bat
 Genus Latidens – Salim Ali's fruit bat
 Genus Megaerops
 Genus Otopteropus – Luzon fruit bat
 Genus Penthetor – dusky fruit bat
 Genus Ptenochirus – musky fruit bats
 Genus Sphaerias – Blanford's fruit bat
 Genus Thoopterus – swift fruit bat
 Subfamily Eidolinae
 Genus Eidolon – straw-colored fruit bats
 Subfamily Harpiyonycterinae
 Genus Aproteles – Bulmer's fruit bat
 Genus Boneia
 Genus Dobsonia – naked-backed fruit bats
 Genus Harpyionycteris – harpy fruit bats
 Subfamily Nyctimeninae
 Genus Nyctimene – tube-nosed fruit bats
 Genus Paranyctimene
 Subfamily Pteropodinae
 Genus Melonycteris
 Tribe Pteropodini
 Genus Acerodon
 Genus Pteralopex – monkey-faced bats
 Genus Pteropus – flying foxes
 Genus Styloctenium – stripe-faced fruit bats
 Subfamily Rousettinae
 Tribe Eonycterini
 Genus Eonycteris – dawn fruit bats
 Tribe Epomophorini
 Genus Epomophorus – epauletted fruit bats
 Genus Epomops – epauletted bats
 Genus Hypsignathus – hammer-headed bat
 Genus Micropteropus – dwarf epauletted bats
 Genus Nanonycteris – Veldkamp's dwarf epauletted fruit bat
 Tribe incertae sedis
 Genus Pilonycteris – Sulawesi fruit bat
 Tribe Myonycterini
 Genus Megaloglossus – Woermann's bat
 Genus Myonycteris – little collared fruit bats
 Tribe Plerotini
 Genus Plerotes – D'Anchieta's fruit bat
 Tribe Rousettini
Genus Rousettus – rousette fruit bats
 Tribe Scotonycterini
 Genus Casinycteris – short-palated fruit bat
 Genus Scotonycteris
 Tribe Stenonycterini
 Genus Stenonycteris
 Subfamily incertae sedis
 Genus Notopteris – long-tailed fruit bats
 Genus Mirimiri – Fijian monkey-faced bat
 Genus Neopteryx – small-toothed fruit bat
 Genus Desmalopex – white-winged flying foxes
 Tribe Macroglossini
 Genus Macroglossus – long-tongued fruit bats
 Genus Syconycteris – blossom bats
 Family Rhinolophidae – horseshoe bats
 Genus Rhinolophus
 Family Rhinopomatidae – mouse-tailed bats
 Genus Rhinopoma
 Family Rhinonycteridae
 Genus Cloeotis – Percival's trident bat
 Genus Paratriaenops
 Genus Rhinonicteris – orange leaf-nosed bat
 Genus Triaenops

Cingulata

 Family Chlamyphoridae – fairy armadillos, giant armadillos, and more
 Subfamily Chlamyphorinae – fairy armadillos
 Genus Calyptophractus – greater fairy armadillo
 Genus Chlamyphorus – pink fairy armadillo
 Subfamily Euphractinae
 Genus Chaetophractus – hairy armadillo
 Genus Euphractus – six-banded armadillo
 Genus Zaedyus – pichi
 Subfamily Tolypeutinae
 Genus Cabassous – naked-tailed armadillos
 Genus Priodontes – giant armadillo
 Genus Tolypeutes – three-banded armadillos
 Family Dasypodidae
 Genus Dasypus – long-nosed armadillos

Dasyuromorphia
The order Dasyuromorphia (meaning "hairy tail") comprises most of the Australian carnivorous marsupials, including quolls, dunnarts, the numbat, the Tasmanian devil, and the thylacine. There are 73 living species in this order, 72 of which belong to the family Dasyuridae and the numbat, of the family Myrmecobiidae.

 Family Dasyuridae – sometimes known as marsupial mice
 Subfamily Dasyurinae
 Tribe Dasyurini
 Genus Dasycercus – mulgaras
 Genus Dasykaluta – little red kaluta
 Genus Dasyuroides – kowari
 Genus Dasyurus – quolls
 Genus Myoictis – three-striped dasyures
 Genus Neophascogale – speckled dasyures
 Genus Parantechinus – dibbler
 Genus Phascolosorex – marsupial shrews
 Genus Pseudantechinus – false antechinuses
 Genus Sarcophilus – Tasmanian devil
 Tribe Phascogalini
 Genus Antechinus – pouched mice
 Genus Micromurexia – Habbema dasyure
 Genus Murexechinus – black-tailed dasyure
 Genus Murexia – short-furred dasyure
 Genus Paramurexia – broad-striped dasyure
 Genus Phascomurexia – long-nosed dasyure
 Genus Phascogale – phascogales, or wambengers
 Subfamily Sminthopsinae
 Tribe Sminthopsini
 Genus Antechinomys – kultarr
 Genus Ningaui – ningauis
 Genus Sminthopsis – dunnarts
 Tribe Planigalini
 Genus Planigale – planigales
 Family Myrmecobiidae
 Genus Myrmecobius – numbat

Dermoptera
Colugos are arboreal gliding mammals found in Southeast Asia. Just two extant species, the Sunda flying lemur and the Philippine flying lemur, make up the entire order Dermoptera.

Family Cynocephalidae – colugos, or flying lemurs
 Genus Cynocephalus – Philippine flying lemur
 Genus Galeopterus – Sunda flying lemur

Didelphimorphia

Order Didelphimorphia is composed of 1 family and 18 genera.

Family Didelphidae – opossum
 Subfamily Caluromyinae
 Genus Caluromys - wooly opossum
 Genus Caluromysiops - black-shouldered opossum
 Subfamily Glironiinae
 Genus Glironia - bushy-tailed opossum
 Subfamily Hyladelphinae
 Genus Hyladelphys - Kalinowski's mouse opossum
 Subfamily Didelphinae
 Tribe Metachirini
 Genus Metachirus - brown four-eyed opossum
 Tribe Didelphini
 Genus Chironectes - water opossum
 Genus Didelphis
 Genus Lutreolina - lutrine opossum
 Genus Philander - gray and black four-eyed opossum
 Tribe Marmosini
 Genus Marmosa - mouse opossum
 Genus Monodelphis - short-tailed opossum
 Genus Tlacuatzin - greyish mouse opossum
 Tribe Thylamyini
 Genus Chacodelphys - Chacoan pigmy opossum
 Genus Cryptonanus
 Genus Gracilinanus - gracile opossum
 Genus Lestodelphys - Patagonian opossum
 Genus Marmosops - slender opossum
 Genus Thylamys - fat-tailed mouse opossum

Diprotodontia

Suborder Vombatiformes 
Family Vombatidae
 Genus Lasiorhinus - hairy-nosed wombat
 Genus Vombatus - common wombat
Family Phascolarctidae
 Genus Phascolarctos - koala

Suborder Phalangeriformes 
Superfamily Phalangeroidea
Family Phalangeridae
 Genus Ailurops - bear cuscus
 Genus Phalanger - cuscus
 Genus Spilocuscus - cuscus
 Genus Strigocuscus - cuscus
 Genus Trichosurus - brushtail possum
 Genus Wyulda - scaly-tailed possum
Family Burramyidae
 Genus Burramys
 Genus Cercartetus - pygmy possums
Superfamily Petauroidea
Family Tarsipedidae
 Genus Tarsipes - honey possum
Family Petauridae
 Genus Dactylopsila
 Genus Gymnobelideus - Leadbeater's possum
 Genus Petaurus - gliders
Family Pseudocheiridae
 Genus Hemibelideus - lemur-like ringtail possum
 Genus Petauroides - greater glider
 Genus Pseudocheirus - common ringtail possum
 Genus Pseudochirops - ringtail possum
 Genus Pseudochirulus - ringtail possum
Family Acrobatidae
 Genus Acrobates - feathertail glider
 Genus Distoechurus - feather-tailed possum

Suborder Macropodiformes 
Family Macropodidae
 Genus Dendrolagus - tree-kangaroo
 Genus Dorcopsis
 Genus Dorcopsulus
 Genus Lagorchestes - hare-wallaby
 Genus Lagostrophus - banded hare-wallaby
 Genus Macropus - gray kangaroos
 Genus Osphranter - red kangaroo, antilopine kangaroo, wallaroos
 Genus Notamacropus - wallabies
 Genus Onychogalea - nail-tail wallaby
 Genus Setonix - quokka
 Genus Thylogale - pademelons
 Genus Wallabia - swamp wallaby
Family Potoroidae
 Genus Aepyprymnus - rufous rat-kangaroo
 Genus Bettongia - bettong
 Genus Potorous - potoroo
Family Hypsiprymnodontidae
 Genus Hypsiprymnodon - musky rat-kangaroo

Eulipotyphla

Family Erinaceidae - hedgehog
 Genus Atelerix
 Genus Echinosorex - moonrat
 Genus Erinaceus
 Genus Hemiechinus
 Genus Hylomys - gymnure
 Genus Mesechinus
 Genus Neohylomys - Hainan gymnure
 Genus Neotetracus - shrew gymnure
 Genus Paraechinus
 Genus Podogymnura
Family Soricidae - shrew
 Genus Anourosorex - Asian mole shrew
 Genus Blarina - American short-tailed shrew
 Genus Blarinella
 Genus Chimarrogale - Asiatic water shrew
 Genus Chodsigoa
 Genus Congosorex - Congo shrew
 Genus Crocidura - white-toothed shrew
 Genus Cryptotis - small-eared shrew
 Genus Diplomesodon - piebald shrew
 Genus Episoriculus - brown-toothed shrew
 Genus Feroculus - Kelaart's long-clawed shrew
 Genus Megasorex - Mexican shrew
 Genus Myosorex - mouse shrew
 Genus Nectogale  - elegant water shrew
 Genus Neomys
 Genus Notiosorex
 Genus Paracrocidura - large-headed shrew
 Genus Ruwenzorisorex - Ruwenzori shrew
 Genus Scutisorex
 Genus Solisorex - Pearson's long-clawed shrew
 Genus Sorex
 Genus Soriculus - Himalayan shrew
 Genus Suncus
 Genus Surdisorex
 Genus Sylvisorex - forest shrew
Family Talpidae - mole
 Genus Condylura - star-nosed mole
 Genus Desmana - Russian desman
 Genus Dymecodon - True's shrew mole
 Genus Euroscaptor
 Genus Galemys - Pyrenean desman
 Genus Mogera
 Genus Neurotrichus
 Genus Parascalops hairy-tailed mole
 Genus Parascaptor - white-tailed mole
 Genus Scalopus - eastern mole
 Genus Scapanulus - Gansu mole
 Genus Scapanus
 Genus Scaptochirus - short-faced mole
 Genus Scaptonyx - long-tailed mole
 Genus Talpa
 Genus Uropsilus
 Genus Urotrichus - Japanese shrew mole
Family Solenodontidae
 Genus Atopogale - Cuban solenodon
 Genus Solenodon - Hispaniolan solenodon

Hyracoidea

Family Procaviidae
 Genus Dendrohyrax - tree hyrax
 Genus Heterohyrax - yellow-spotted rock hyrax
 Genus Procavia - rock hyrax

Lagomorpha

Family Leporidae
 Genus Brachylagus - pygmy rabbit
 Genus Bunolagus - riverine rabbit
 Genus Caprolagus - hispid hare
 Genus Lepus - hare
 Genus Nesolagus -  striped rabbit
 Genus Oryctolagus - European rabbit
 Genus Pentalagus - Amami rabbit
 Genus Poelagus - Bunyoro rabbit
 Genus Pronolagus - red rock hare
 Genus Romerolagus - volcano rabbit
 Genus Sylvilagus - cottontail rabbit
Family Ochotonidae
 Genus Ochotona - pikas
 Genus Prolagus - Sardinian pika

Macroscelidea
Family Macroscelididae - elephant shrew
 Genus Elephantulus
 Genus Galegeeska
 Genus Macroscelides
 Genus Petrodromus
 Genus Petrosaltator
 Genus Rhynchocyon

Microbiotheria
Family Microbiotheriidae
 Genus Dromiciops - monito del monte

Monotremata
Family Ornithorhynchidae
 Genus Ornithorhynchus - platypus
Family Tachyglossidae – echidna
 Genus Tachyglossus - short-beaked echidna
 Genus Zaglossus long-beaked echidna

Notoryctemorphia
Family Notoryctidae 
 Genus Notoryctes - marsupial mole

Paucituberculata
Family Caenolestidae
 Genus Caenolestes - common shrew opossums 
 Genus Lestoros - Incan caenolestid
 Genus Rhyncholestes - long-nosed caenolestid

Peramelemorphia
Family Peramelidae
 Subfamily Echymiperinae
 Genus Echymipera - New Guinean spiny bandicoot
 Genus Microperoryctes - New Guinean mouse bandicoot
 Genus Rhynchomeles - Seram bandicoot
 Subfamily Peramelinae
 Genus Isoodon - short-nosed bandicoot
 Genus Perameles
 Subfamily Peroryctinae
 Genus Peroryctes - New Guinean long-nosed bandicoot
Family Thylacomyidae
 Genus Macrotis - bilbie

Perissodactyla

Suborder Hippomorpha 
Family Equidae
 Genus Equus - horse and allies

Suborder Ceratomorpha 
Family Rhinocerotidae
 Tribe Dicerotini
 Genus Ceratotherium - white rhinoceros
 Genus Dicerorhinus -  two-horned Sumatran rhinoceros
 Genus Diceros - black rhinoceros
Tribe Rhinocerotini
 Genus Rhinoceros - one-horned rhinoceros
Family Tapiridae
 Genus Tapirus - South American tapirs

Pholidota
Family Manidae - pangolin
 Genus Manis
 Genus Phataginus
 Genus Smutsia

Pilosa

Suborder Vermilingua 
Family Cyclopedidae
 Genus Cyclopes - silky anteater
Family Myrmecophagidae
 Genus Myrmecophaga - giant anteater
 Genus Tamandua

Suborder Folivora 
Family Bradypodidae
 Genus Bradypus three-toed sloths
Family Choloepodidae
 Genus Choloepus two-toed sloths

Primates

Suborder Haplorhini 
 Infraorder Simiiformes
 Parvorder Catarrhini - Old World monkey
 Superfamily Cercopithecoidea
 Family Cercopithecidae
 Subfamily Cercopithecinae
 Tribe Cercopithecini
 Genus Allenopithecus - Allen's swamp monkey
 Genus Allochrocebus
 Genus Cercopithecus
 Genus Chlorocebus
 Genus Erythrocebus
 Genus Miopithecus - talapoins
 Tribe Papionini
 Genus Cercocebus - white-eyelid mangabeys
 Genus Lophocebus - crested mangabeys
 Genus Macaca - macaques
 Genus Mandrillus - drill and mandrill
 Genus Papio - baboons
 Genus Rungwecebus - kipunji
 Genus Theropithecus - gelada
 Subfamily Colobinae
 Genus Colobus - black-and-white colobuses
 Genus Piliocolobus - red colobuses
 Genus Presbytis - surilis
 Genus Nasalis - proboscis monkey
 Genus Procolobus - olive colobus
 Genus Pygathrix - doucs
 Genus Rhinopithecus - snub-nosed monkeys
 Genus Semnopithecus - gray langurs
 Genus Simias - pig-tailed langur
 Genus Trachypithecus - lutungs
 Superfamily Hominoidea
 Family Hominidae
 Subfamily Homininae
 Tribe Gorillini
 Genus Gorilla - gorillas
 Tribe Hominini
 Genus Homo - human
 Genus Pan - chimpanzee and bonobo
 Subfamily Ponginae
 Genus Pongo - orangutans
Family Hylobatidae - gibbon
 Genus Hoolock - hoolock gibbons
 Genus Hylobates
 Genus Nomascus
 Genus Symphalangus - siamang
 Parvorder Platyrrhini - New World monkey
 Family Aotidae
 Genus Aotus - night monkey
 Family Atelidae
 Subfamily Alouattinae
 Genus Alouatta - howler monkey
 Subfamily Atelinae
 Genus Ateles - spider monkey
 Genus Brachyteles - muriqui
 Genus Lagothrix - woolly monkey
 Family Callitrichidae
 Genus Callimico - Goeldi's marmoset
 Genus Callithrix
 Genus Cebuella - pygmy marmosets
 Genus Leontocebus - saddle-back tamarins
 Genus Leontopithecus - lion tamarin
 Genus Mico
 Genus Saguinus - tamarins
 Family Cebidae
 Subfamily Cebinae
 Genus Cebus - gracile capuchin monkeys
 Genus Sapajus - robust capuchin monkeys
 Subfamily Saimirinae
 Genus Saimiri - squirrel monkeys
 Family Pitheciidae
 Subfamily Callicebinae
 Genus Callicebus
 Genus Cheracebus
 Genus Plecturocebus
 Subfamily Pitheciinae
 Genus Cacajao - uakaris
 Genus Chiropotes - bearded sakis
 Genus Pithecia - sakis
 Infraorder Tarsiiformes
 Family Tarsiidae
 Genus Carlito - Philippine tarsier
 Genus Cephalopachus - Horsfield's tarsier
 Genus Tarsius - tarsier

Suborder Strepsirrhini 
 Infraorder Lemuriformes
 Superfamily Lemuroidea
 Family Cheirogaleidae
 Genus Allocebus - hairy-eared dwarf lemur
 Genus Cheirogaleus - dwarf lemur
 Genus Microcebus - mouse lemur
 Genus Mirza - giant mouse lemur
 Genus Phaner - fork-marked lemur
 Family Daubentoniidae
 Genus Daubentonia - aye-aye
 Family Indriidae
 Genus Avahi - wooly lemur
 Genus Indri
 Genus Propithecus - sifaka
 Family Lemuridae
 Genus Eulemur - true lemur	
 Genus Hapalemur - bamboo lemur	
 Genus Lemur - ring-tailed lemur
 Genus Varecia - ruffed lemur	
 Family Lepilemuridae
 Genus Lepilemur - sportive lemur
 Superfamily Lorisoidea
 Family Galagidae
 Genus Euoticus - needle-clawed bushbabies
 Genus Galago - lesser bushbabies
 Genus Galagoides - western dwarf galagos
 Genus Otolemur - greater galago
 Genus Paragalago - eastern dwarf galagos
 Genus Scuirocheirus - squirrel galagos
 Family Lorisidae
 Subfamily Lorinae
 Genus Loris - slender lorises
 Genus Nycticebus - slow lorises
 Genus Xanthonycticebus - pygmy slow loris
 Subfamily Perodicticinae
 Genus Arctocebus - angwantibos
 Genus Perodicticus - pottos
 Genus Pseudopotto - false potto

Proboscidea
Family Elephantidae
 Genus Loxodonta – African elephants
 Genus Mammuthus† - mammoth
 Genus Elephas – Asian elephant

Rodentia

Suborder Anomaluromorpha 
Family Anomaluridae
 Genus Anomalurus - scaly-tailed squirrel
 Genus Idiurus - flying mouse
 Genus Zenkerella - Cameroon scaly-tail
Family Pedetidae
Genus Pedetes

Suborder Castorimorpha 
Family Castoridae
 Genus Castor - beavers
Family Geomyidae - pocket gopher
 Genus Cratogeomys
 Genus Geomys
 Genus Orthogeomys
 Genus Pappogeomys
 Genus Thomomys - smooth-toothed pocket gopher
 Genus Zygogeomys - Michoacan pocket gopher
Family Heteromyidae - pocket mouse
 Genus Dipodomys - kangaroo rat
 Genus Heteromys
 Genus Chaetodipus
 Genus Perognathus

Suborder Hystricomorpha 
Family Ctenodactylidae
 Genus Ctenodactylus
 Genus Felovia - felou gundi
 Genus Massoutiera - Mzab gundi
 Genus Pectinator - Speke's pectinator
Family Diatomyidae
 Genus Laonastes - Laotian rock rat
Family Caviidae
 Genus Cavia - guinea pigs
 Genus Dolichotis - mara
 Genus Galea - yellow-toothed cavy
 Genus Hydrochoerus
 Genus Kerodon
 Genus Microcavia - mountain cavy
Family Cuniculidae
 Genus Cuniculus - pacas
Family Dasyproctidae
 Genus Dasyprocta - agouti
 Genus Myoprocta - acouchi
Family Abrocomidae
 Genus Abrocoma - chinchilla rat
 Genus Cuscomys
Family Chinchillidae
 Genus Chinchilla
 Genus Lagidium
 Genus Lagostomus
Family Dinomyidae
 Genus Dinomys - pacarana
Family Erethizontidae
 Genus Chaetomys - bristle-spined rat
 Genus Coendou - prehensile-tailed porcupine
 Genus Erethizon - North American porcupine
Family Capromyidae
 Genus Capromys - Desmarest's hutia
 Genus Geocapromys - Bahamian and Jamaican hutias
 Genus Mesocapromys - dwarf hutias
 Genus Mysateles
 Genus Plagiodontia - Hispaniolan hutia
Family Ctenomyidae
 Genus Ctenomys - tuco-tuco
Family Echimyidae
 Genus Callistomys - painted tree-rat
 Genus Carterodon - Owl's spiny rat
 Genus Clyomys
 Genus Dactylomys - bamboo-rat
 Genus Diplomys - soft-furred spiny rat
 Genus Echimys
 Genus Euryzygomatomys - guiara
 Genus Hoplomys - armored rat
 Genus Isothrix - brush-tailed rat
 Genus Kannabateomys - Atlantic bamboo rat
 Genus Lonchothrix - tuft-tailed spiny tree-rat
 Genus Makalata
 Genus Mesomys - spiny tree-rat
 Genus Myocastor - coypu
 Genus Olallamys
 Genus Pattonomys
 Genus Phyllomys
 Genus Proechimys
 Genus Thrichomys - punaré
 Genus Toromys - giant tree-rat
 Genus Trinomys - Atlantic spiny rat
Family Octodontidae
 Genus Aconaemys - rock rat
 Genus Octodon
 Genus Octodontomys - mountain degu
 Genus Octomys - mountain viscacha rat
 Genus Pipanacoctomys - golden viscacha rat
 Genus Spalacopus - coruro
 Genus Tympanoctomys - Chalchalero viscacha rat
Family Bathyergidae - mole-rat
 Genus Bathyergus
 Genus Cryptomys
 Genus Fukomys
 Genus Georychus - Cape mole-rat
 Genus Heliophobius - silvery mole-rat
Family Heterocephalidae
 Genus Heterocephalus - naked mole-rat
Family Hystricidae
 Genus Atherurus - brush-tailed porcupine
 Genus Hystrix
 Genus Trichys - long-tailed porcupine
Family Petromuridae
 Genus Petromus - dassie rat
Family Thryonomyidae
 Genus Thryonomys - cane rat

Suborder Myomorpha 
Family Dipodidae - jerboa and jumping mouse
 Genus Dipodidae
 Genus Allactaga
 Genus Allactodipus - Bobrinski's jerboa
 Genus Cardiocranius - five-toed pygmy jerboa
 Genus Dipus - northern three-toed jerboa
 Genus Eozapus - Chinese jumping mouse
 Genus Eremodipus - Lichtenstein's jerboa
 Genus Euchoreutes - long-eared jerboa
 Genus Jaculus
 Genus Microdipodops - kangaroo mouse
 Genus Napaeozapus - woodland jumping mouse
 Genus Paradipus - comb-toed jerboa
 Genus Pygeretmus - fat-tailed jerboa
 Genus Salpingotulus - Baluchistan pygmy jerboa
 Genus Salpingotus
 Genus Sicista - birch mouse
 Genus Stylodipus - three-toed jerboa
 Genus Zapus
Family Calomyscidae
 Genus Calomyscus - mouse-like hamster
Family Cricetidae
 Genus Abrawayaomys - Ruschi's rat
 Genus Abrothrix
 Genus Aegialomys
 Genus Aepeomys - montane mouse
 Genus Akodon - South American grass mouse
 Genus Allocricetulus - hamster
 Genus Alticola - vole
 Genus Amphinectomys - Ucayali water rat
 Genus Andalgalomys - chaco mouse
 Genus Andinomys - Andean mouse
 Genus Anotomys - aquatic rat
 Genus Arborimus - tree vole
 Genus Arvicola - water vole
 Genus Auliscomys - big-eared mouse
 Genus Baiomys - pygmy mouse
 Genus Bibimys - crimson-nosed rat
 Genus Blanfordimys - vole
 Genus Blarinomys - Brazilian shrew mouse
 Genus Brucepattersonius - brucie
 Genus Calomys - vesper mouse
 Genus Cansumys - Gansu hamster
 Genus Caryomys
 Genus Cerradomys
 Genus Chelemys
 Genus Chibchanomys - water mouse
 Genus Chilomys - Colombian forest mouse
 Genus Chinchillula - Altiplano chinchilla mouse
 Genus Chionomys - snow vole
 Genus Cricetulus
 Genus Cricetus - European hamster
 Genus Delomys - forest rat
 Genus Deltamys - Kemp's grass mouse
 Genus Dicrostonyx - collared lemming
 Genus Dinaromys - Balkan snow vole
 Genus Drymoreomys
 Genus Eligmodontia
 Genus Ellobius - mole vole
 Genus Eolagurus
 Genus Eothenomys
 Genus Eremoryzomys - gray rice rat
 Genus Euneomys - chinchilla mouse
 Genus Euryoryzomys
 Genus Galenomys - Garlepp's mouse
 Genus Geoxus
 Genus Geoxus - Pearson's long-clawed akodont
 Genus Graomys - leaf-eared mouse
 Genus Habromys - deer mouse
 Genus Handleyomys
 Genus Hodomys - Allen's woodrat
 Genus Holochilus - marsh rat
 Genus Hylaeamys
 Genus Hyperacrius
 Genus Ichthyomys - crab-eating rat
 Genus Irenomys
 Genus Isthmomys - isthmus rat
 Genus Juliomys
 Genus Juscelinomys
 Genus Kunsia
 Genus Lagurus
 Genus Lasiopodomys
 Genus Lemmiscus - sagebrush vole
 Genus Lemmus - true lemming
 Genus Lenoxus - Andean rat
 Genus Loxodontomys
 Genus Lundomys
 Genus Megadontomys - giant deer mouse
 Genus Melanomys
 Genus Mesocricetus - golden hamster
 Genus Microakodontomys - transitional colilargo
 Genus Microryzomys
 Genus Microtus
 Genus Mindomys
 Genus Myodes - red-backed vole
 Genus Myopus - wood lemming
 Genus Neacomys
 Genus Necromys
 Genus Nectomys
 Genus Nelsonia - wood rat
 Genus Neodon
 Genus Neofiber - round-tailed muskrat
 Genus Neotoma - pack rat
 Genus Neotomodon - Mexican volcano mouse
 Genus Neotomys - Andean swamp rat
 Genus Nephelomys
 Genus Nesoryzomys
 Genus Neusticomys - fish-eating rat
 Genus Notiomys
 Genus Nyctomys - Sumichrast's vesper rat
 Genus Ochrotomys - golden mouse
 Genus Oecomys
 Genus Oligoryzomys
 Genus Ondatra - muskrat
 Genus Onychomys - grasshopper mouse
 Genus Oreoryzomys
 Genus Oryzomys
 Genus Osgoodomys - Michoacan deer mouse
 Genus Otonyctomys - Hatt's vesper rat
 Genus Ototylomys - big-eared climbing rat
 Genus Oxymycterus - hocicudo
 Genus Peromyscus - deer mouse
 Genus Phaenomys - Rio de Janeiro arboreal rat
 Genus Phaiomys - Blyth's vole
 Genus Phenacomys - heather vole
 Genus Phodopus
 Genus Phyllotis - gerbil leaf-eared mouse
 Genus Phyllotis - leaf-eared mouse
 Genus Podomys - Florida mouse
 Genus Podoxymys - Roraima mouse
 Genus Proedromys
 Genus Prometheomys - long-clawed mole vole
 Genus Pseudoryzomys - Brazilian false rice rat
 Genus Punomys - puna mouse
 Genus Reithrodon
 Genus Reithrodontomys - harvest mouse
 Genus Rhagomys - arboreal mouse
 Genus Rheomys - water mouse
 Genus Rhipidomys - climbing mouse
 Genus Salinomys - delicate salt flat mouse
 Genus Scapteromys
 Genus Scolomys
 Genus Scotinomys
 Genus Sigmodon - cotton rat
 Genus Sigmodontomys
 Genus Sooretamys - rat-headed rice rat
 Genus Synaptomys - bog lemming
 Genus Tanyuromys
 Genus Tapecomys - primordial tapecua
 Genus Thalpomys - cerrado mouse
 Genus Thaptomys - blackish grass mouse
 Genus Thomasomys - Oldfield mouse
 Genus Transandinomys
 Genus Tscherskia - greater long-tailed hamster
 Genus Tylomys - climbing rat
 Genus Volemys
 Genus Wiedomys - red-nosed mouse
 Genus Wilfredomys - greater Wilfred's mouse
 Genus Xenomys - Magdalena rat
 Genus Zygodontomys
Family Muridae
 Genus Abditomys - Luzon broad-toothed rat
 Genus Abeomelomys - highland brush mouse
 Genus Acomys - spiny mouse
 Genus Aethomys - rock rat
 Genus Ammodillus - ammodile
 Genus Anisomys - squirrel-toothed rat
 Genus Anonymomys - Mindoro climbing rat
 Genus Apodemus - Eurasian field mouse
 Genus Apomys - earthworm mice
 Genus Archboldomys - shrew-mice
 Genus Arvicanthis - grass rat
 Genus Baiyankamys
 Genus Bandicota - bandicoot rat
 Genus Batomys - hairy-tailed rat
 Genus Berylmys - white-toothed rat
 Genus Brachiones - Przewalski's gerbil
 Genus Bullimus
 Genus Bunomys - hill rat
 Genus Carpomys - Luzon tree rat
 Genus Chiromyscus - Fea's tree rat
 Genus Chiropodomys - pencil-tailed tree mouse
 Genus Chiruromys
 Genus Chrotomys
 Genus Coccymys
 Genus Colomys - African wading rat
 Genus Conilurus - rabbit rat
 Genus Crateromys
 Genus Cremnomys
 Genus Crossomys - earless water rat
 Genus Crunomys - shrew-rat
 Genus Dacnomys - Millard's rat
 Genus Dasymys
 Genus Deomys - link rat
 Genus Dephomys
 Genus Desmodilliscus - pouched gerbil
 Genus Desmodillus - Cape short-eared gerbil
 Genus Desmomys
 Genus Diomys - Crump's mouse
 Genus Diplothrix - Ryukyu long-tailed giant rat
 Genus Dipodillus
 Genus Echiothrix
 Genus Eropeplus - Sulawesi soft-furred rat
 Genus Gerbilliscus
 Genus Gerbillurus - hairy-footed gerbil
 Genus Gerbillus
 Genus Golunda - Indian bush rat
 Genus Grammomys - thicket rat
 Genus Hadromys
 Genus Haeromys - ranee mouse
 Genus Hapalomys - marmoset rat
 Genus Heimyscus - African smoky mouse
 Genus Hybomys - striped mouse
 Genus Hydromys
 Genus Hylomyscus - wood mouse
 Genus Hyomys - white-eared giant rats
 Genus Kadarsanomys - Sody's tree rat
 Genus Komodomys - Komodo rat
 Genus Lamottemys - Mount Oku rat
 Genus Leggadina
 Genus Leimacomys - Togo mouse
 Genus Lemniscomys - striped grass mouse
 Genus Lenomys - trefoil-toothed giant rat
 Genus Lenothrix - gray tree rat
 Genus Leopoldamys - long-tailed giant rat
 Genus Leporillus - stick-nest rat
 Genus Leptomys
 Genus Limnomys - mountain rat
 Genus Lophiomys - maned rat
 Genus Lophuromys - brush-furred mouse
 Genus Lorentzimys - New Guinean jumping mouse
 Genus Macruromys - small-toothed rat
 Genus Madromys - Blanford's rat
 Genus Malacomys - swamp rat
 Genus Mallomys - woolly rat
 Genus Mammelomys - mosaic-tailed rat
 Genus Margaretamys - margareta rat
 Genus Mastacomys - broad-toothed mouse
 Genus Mastomys - multimammate mouse
 Genus Maxomys - spiny rat
 Genus Melasmothrix - Sulawesian shrew rat
 Genus Melomys - mosaic-tailed rat
 Genus Meriones - jird
 Genus Mesembriomys - tree rat
 Genus Microdillus - Somali pygmy gerbil
 Genus Microhydromys - groove-toothed moss mouse
 Genus Micromys
 Genus Millardia - soft-furred rat
 Genus Mirzamys - moss rat
 Genus Muriculus - Ethiopian striped mouse
 Genus Mus
 Genus Musseromys
 Genus Mylomys
 Genus Myomyscus
 Genus Myotomys - vlei rat
 Genus Nesokia - short-tailed bandicoot rat
 Genus Nesoromys - Ceram rat
 Genus Nilopegamys - Ethiopian amphibious rat
 Genus Niviventer
 Genus Notomys - hopping mouse
 Genus Oenomys - rufous-nosed rat
 Genus Otomys - vlei rat
 Genus Pachyuromys - fat-tailed gerbil
 Genus Palawanomys - Palawan soft-furred mountain rat
 Genus Papagomys
 Genus Parahydromys - New Guinea waterside rat
 Genus Paraleptomys - water rat
 Genus Paramelomys
 Genus Parotomys - whistling rat
 Genus Paruromys - Sulawesi giant rat
 Genus Paucidentomys
 Genus Paulamys - Flores long-nosed rat
 Genus Pelomys - groove-toothed swamp rat
 Genus Phloeomys - cloud rat
 Genus Pithecheir - tree rat
 Genus Pithecheirops
 Genus Pogonomelomys
 Genus Pogonomys
 Genus Praomys
 Genus Protochromys - red-bellied mosaic-tailed rat
 Genus Psammomys
 Genus Pseudohydromys
 Genus Pseudomys
 Genus Rattus
 Genus Rhabdomys
 Genus Rhombomys - great gerbil
 Genus Rhynchomys - shrewlike rat
 Genus Saxatilomys - Paulina's limestone rat
 Genus Sekeetamys - bushy-tailed jird
 Genus Solomys
 Genus Sommeromys - Sommer's Sulawesi rat
 Genus Srilankamys - Ohiya rat
 Genus Stenocephalemys
 Genus Stochomys - target rat
 Genus Sundamys
 Genus Taeromys
 Genus Tarsomys - long-footed rat
 Genus Tateomys
 Genus Tatera - Indian gerbil
 Genus Taterillus
 Genus Thallomys
 Genus Thamnomys - thicket rat
 Genus Tokudaia
 Genus Tonkinomys - Daovantien's limestone rat
 Genus Tryphomys - Luzon short-nosed rat
 Genus Uranomys - Rudd's mouse
 Genus Uromys
 Genus Vandeleuria
 Genus Vernaya
 Genus Waiomys
 Genus Xenuromys - mimic tree rat
 Genus Xeromys - false water rat
 Genus Zelotomys - broad-headed mouse
 Genus Zyzomys
Family Nesomyidae
 Genus Beamys - hamster-rat
 Genus Brachytarsomys - antsangy
 Genus Brachyuromys - short-tailed rat
 Genus Cricetomys - giant pouched rat
 Genus Delanymys - Delany's mouse
 Genus Dendromus - climbing mouse
 Genus Dendroprionomys - velvet climbing mouse
 Genus Eliurus - tufted-tailed rat
 Genus Gymnuromys - voalavoanala
 Genus Hypogeomys - Malagasy giant rat
 Genus Macrotarsomys - big-footed mouse
 Genus Malacothrix - gerbil mouse
 Genus Megadendromus - Nikolaus's mouse
 Genus Monticolomys - Malagasy mountain mouse
 Genus Mystromys - white-tailed rat
 Genus Nesomys
 Genus Petromyscus - rock mouse
 Genus Prionomys - Dollman's tree mouse
 Genus Saccostomus - pouched mouse
 Genus Steatomys - fat mouse
Family Platacanthomyidae
 Genus Platacanthomys - Malabar spiny dormouse
 Genus Typhlomys - Chinese pygmy dormouse
Family Spalacidae
 Genus Cannomys - lesser bamboo rat
 Genus Eospalax - zokor
 Genus Myospalax
 Genus Rhizomys - bamboo rat
 Genus Spalax - spalax
 Genus Tachyoryctes

Suborder Sciuromorpha 
Family Aplodontiidae
 Genus Aplodontia - mountain beaver
Family Gliridae
 Genus Chaetocauda - Chinese dormouse
 Genus Dryomys
 Genus Eliomys
 Genus Glirulus - Japanese dormouse
 Genus Glis - edible dormouse
 Genus Graphiurus - African dormouse
 Genus Muscardinus - hazel dormouse
 Genus Myomimus - mouse-tailed dormouse
 Genus Selevinia - desert dormouse
Family Sciuridae
 Genus Aeretes - groove-toothed flying squirrel
 Genus Aeromys - large black flying squirrel
 Genus Ammospermophilus - antelope squirrel
 Genus Atlantoxerus - Barbary ground squirrel
 Genus Belomys - hairy-footed flying squirrel
 Genus Biswamoyopterus - Namdapha flying squirrel
 Genus Callosciurus
 Genus Cynomys - prairie dog
 Genus Dremomys - red-cheeked squirrel
 Genus Eoglaucomys - Kashmir flying squirrel
 Genus Epixerus
 Genus Eupetaurus - woolly flying squirrel
 Genus Eutamias
 Genus Exilisciurus - pygmy squirrel
 Genus Funambulus - palm squirrel
 Genus Funisciurus - African striped squirrels
 Genus Glaucomys - New World flying squirrel
 Genus Glyphotes - sculptor squirrel
 Genus Heliosciurus - sun squirrel
 Genus Hylopetes
 Genus Hyosciurus - long-nosed squirrel
 Genus Iomys
 Genus Lariscus
 Genus Marmota - marmot
 Genus Menetes - Berdmore's ground squirrel
 Genus Microsciurus - dwarf squirrel
 Genus Myosciurus - African pygmy squirrel
 Genus Nannosciurus - black-eared squirrel
 Genus Neotamias
 Genus Notocitellus
 Genus Otospermophilus
 Genus Paraxerus - African bush squirrel
 Genus Petaurillus - pygmy flying squirrel
 Genus Petaurista - giant flying squirrel
 Genus Petinomys
 Genus Poliocitellus - Franklin's ground squirrel
 Genus Priapomys - Himalayan large-eared flying squirrel
Genus Prosciurillus
 Genus Protoxerus - African giant squirrel
 Genus Pteromys - Old World flying squirrel
 Genus Pteromyscus - smoky flying squirrel
 Genus Ratufa - oriental giant squirrel
 Genus Rheithrosciurus - tufted ground squirrel
 Genus Rhinosciurus - shrew-faced squirrel
 Genus Rubrisciurus - red-bellied squirrel
 Genus Sciurillus - Neotropical pygmy squirrel
 Genus Sciurotamias
 Genus Sciurus
 Genus Spermophilopsis - long-clawed ground squirrel
 Genus Spermophilus
 Genus Sundasciurus
 Genus Syntheosciurus - Bangs's mountain squirrel
 Genus Tamias
 Genus Tamiasciurus - pine squirrels
 Genus Tamiops - Asiatic striped squirrel
 Genus Trogopterus - complex-toothed flying squirrel
 Genus Xerospermophilus
 Genus Xerus - African ground squirrel

Scandentia

In the past, various authors proposed to place treeshrews in the ordinal rank Insectivora, or considered them close relatives of primates. Since 1972, the treeshrew families Tupaiidae and Ptilocercidae are grouped in the order Scandentia.

 Family Ptilocercidae
 Genus Ptilocercus  - pen-tailed treeshrew
 Family Tupaiidae
 Genus Anathana - Madras treeshrew
 Genus Dendrogale - smooth-tailed treeshrew
 Genus Tupaia

Sirenia

 Family Dugongidae
 Genus Dugong - dugong
 Genus Hydrodamalis - Steller's sea cow
 Family Trichechidae
 Genus Trichechus - manatees

Tubulidentata

 Family Orycteropodidae
 Genus Orycteropus - aardvark

See also 
 List of placental mammals - species list
 List of monotremes and marsupials - species list
 Mammal classification
 Lists of mammals by population

References 

Taxonomic lists (genera, taxonomic)
Mammal